Grandview Lake is an platted town and census-designated place in Ohio Township, Bartholomew County, in the U.S. state of Indiana. It shares its name with the lake at its center. It was largely developed in the 1960s.

Geography
The dam, completed in 1965, is at the head of the East Fork White Creek.

See also
List of lakes of Indiana

References

Unincorporated communities in Bartholomew County, Indiana
Unincorporated communities in Indiana
Bodies of water of Bartholomew County, Indiana